It Happened Thus is a 1912 American silent short romantic drama starring Charlotte Burton and Owen Moore.

Cast
 Charlotte Burton as The Older Daughter
 Fritzi Brunette as The Younger Daughter
 Owen Moore

External links

1912 films
1912 romantic drama films
1912 short films
American romantic drama films
American silent short films
American black-and-white films
1910s American films
Silent romantic drama films
Silent American drama films
1910s English-language films